Governor Conley may refer to:

Benjamin F. Conley (1815–1886), 47th Governor of Georgia
William G. Conley (1866–1940), 18th Governor of West Virginia

See also
John Connally (1917–1993), 39th Governor of Texas
Henry Connelly (1800–1866), Governor of New Mexico Territory